Arablu may refer to:
 Arablu, Ardabil
 Arablu, East Azerbaijan
 Arablu, Hamadan
 Arablu, West Azerbaijan
 Arablu-ye Bisheh, West Azerbaijan Province
 Arablu-ye Darreh, West Azerbaijan Province
 Arablu-ye Yekan, West Azerbaijan Province